The 1945–46 Detroit Red Wings season was the Detroit NHL franchise's 20th season of operation.

Offseason

Regular season

Final standings

Record vs. opponents

Schedule and results

Playoffs
The Boston Bruins finished second in the league with 56 points. The Detroit Red Wings finished fourth with 50 points. This was the fifth playoff meeting between these two teams with Detroit winning the three of the four previous series. They last met in the previous season's Stanley Cup semifinals where the Red Wings won in seven games. Boston won the season's ten-game regular-season series earning eleven of twenty points.

Player statistics

Regular season
Scoring

Goaltending

Playoffs
Scoring

Goaltending

Note: GP = Games played; G = Goals; A = Assists; Pts = Points; +/- = Plus-minus PIM = Penalty minutes; PPG = Power-play goals; SHG = Short-handed goals; GWG = Game-winning goals;
      MIN = Minutes played; W = Wins; L = Losses; T = Ties; GA = Goals against; GAA = Goals-against average;  SO = Shutouts;

Awards and records

Transactions

See also
1945–46 NHL season

References

External links
 

Detroit
Detroit
Detroit Red Wings seasons
Detroit Red Wings
Detroit Red Wings